Workplace politics is the process and behavior that in human interactions involves power and authority. It is also a tool to assess the operational capacity and to balance diverse views of interested parties. It is also known as office politics and organizational politics.
It involves the use of power and social networking within a workplace to achieve changes that benefit the individuals within it. "Organizational politics are self-serving behaviors" that "employees use to increase the probability of obtaining positive outcomes in organizations". Influence by individuals may serve personal interests without regard to their effect on the organization itself. Some of the personal advantages may include:

 access to tangible assets
 or intangible benefits such as status
 pseudo-authority that influences the behavior of others

Positive politics are behaviors that are designed to influence others with the goal of helping both the organization and the person playing the politics.
Examples of positive politics include portraying a professional image, publicizing one's accomplishments, volunteering, and complimenting others.
On the other hand, organizational politics can increase efficiency, form interpersonal relationships, expedite change, and profit the organization and its members simultaneously.
Both individuals and groups may engage in office politics which can be highly destructive, as people focus on personal gains at the expense of the organization. "Self-serving political actions can negatively influence our social groupings, cooperation, information sharing, and many other organizational functions." Thus it is vital to pay attention to organizational politics and create the right political landscape. Negative politics are designed to achieve personal gain at the expense of others and the organization.
Examples of negative politics are spreading rumors, talking behind someone’s back, and not telling someone important information.
"Politics is the lubricant that oils your organization's internal gears."  John Eldred has characterized politics as "simply how power gets worked out on a practical, day-to-day basis."

Psychologist Oliver James identifies the dark triadic personality traits (psychopathy, narcissism and Machiavellianism) as of central significance in understanding office politics.

The political landscape
Political landscape is a set of hierarchies that link the political players together. In other words, political landscape is what defines relationships between colleagues at a given time.  Drafting of this landscape begins with the leaders of the organization influencing the formal hierarchy; which defines the reporting structure and indicates the political setup of the organization as it was initially intended.  Organizational hierarchies, each members with its own unique political challenges, depend on many factors of the given organization. Said factors include organizational goals, size of the organization, number of resources available and the type of leaders within the organization. Political landscape will change as individuals are introduced into the organizational mix. 
During the process of working together an informal hierarchy is established. The main link between individuals on a political landscape is the access to-in addition to-the flow of information. This hierarchy can be identified by applying numerical values to relationships in proportion to how much two individuals rate and value one another. The sum value of these relating to an individual establishes the place on the hierarchy.  Two or more people estimating relationships and merging results can produce more certain results.  People quickly realize who the boss is, whom they depend on for valuable information, and who knows all the office gossip. It is very important to recognize where you fit in this landscape and what power and influence you have within the organization. It is important not only to use that power in pursuit of the organization's goals, but also to ensure others do not abuse it. "Each player in the organization has a role in the politics that grease the wheels of getting things done."

Gossip

Office politics differs from office gossip in that people participating in office politics do so with the objective of gaining advantage, whereas gossip can be a purely social activity. However, the two are somewhat related. Office gossip is often used by an individual to place themselves at a point where they can control the flow of information, and therefore gain maximum advantage. The secretive nature of organizational politics differentiates it from public gossip and thus, may be more harmful to the organization. Both can cause one to doubt the intentions of co-workers, which creates a hostile work environment. Office politics also refers to the way co-workers act among each other. Employee interaction holds the potential to  be either positive or negative (i.e. cooperative or competitive).

Manipulation

At the root of office politics is the issue of manipulation. Manipulation can be present in any relationship where one or more of the parties involved uses indirect means to carry out an agenda. In a workplace where resources are limited, individuals often find themselves presented with an opportunity to carry out a personal agenda at the expense of their colleagues. For example, if six people apply for one promotion, they might expect the selection to be made purely on merit. If one of the candidates were to believe that this would put them at a disadvantage, they may use other means of coercion or influence to put themselves into an advantageous position. When those who have fallen subject to the manipulation begin to talk to each other directly—or when other evidence comes to light such as financial results—the manipulator will have an explanation ready but will already be planning their exit, as they are driven to stay in control, not to face a revelation which would expose his behavior.

Aims

The aims of office politics or manipulation in the workplace are not always increased pay or a promotion. Often, the goal may simply be greater power or control for its own end; or to discredit a competitor. Office politics do not necessarily stem from purely selfish gains.  They can be a route towards corporate benefits, which give a leg up to the company as a whole, not just an individual. "A 'manipulator' will often achieve career or personal goals by co-opting as many colleagues as possible into their plans." Despite the fact that the hidden agenda is a personal victory, allying with unsuspecting co-workers strengthens the manipulator's personal position and ensures that they will be the last person accused of wrongdoing.

Issues

Office politics is a major issue in business because the individuals who manipulate their working relationships consume time and resources for their own gain at the expense of the team or company.

In addition to this problem, the practice of office politics can have an even more serious effect on major business processes such as strategy formation, budget setting, performance management, and leadership. This occurs because when individuals are playing office politics, it interferes with the information flow of a company. Information can be distorted, misdirected, or suppressed, in order to manipulate a situation for short-term personal gain.

Games

One way of analyzing office politics in more detail is to view it as a series of games. These games can be analyzed and described in terms of the type of game and the payoff. Interpersonal games are games that are played between peers (for example the game of "No Bad News" where individuals suppress negative information, and the payoff is not risking upsetting someone); leadership games are played between supervisor and employee (for example the game of "Divide and Conquer" where the supervisor sets his employees against each other, with the payoff that none threatens his power base); and budget games are played with the resources of an organization (for example the game of "Sandbagging" where individuals negotiate a low sales target, and the payoff is a bigger bonus).

Dealing with organizational politics

Organizational politics is itself similar to a game, one that requires an assumption of risks just like any contact sport. "It must be played with diligence and a full understanding of the landscape, players and rules."  "The dynamics of the situation should always dictate a reexamination of the players and how they fit into the landscape."  One must be careful relying on alliances made on previous circumstances; once the situation changes, alliances need to be reassessed. Building strong alliances will maximize the efficiency of the collective political radar and alert you before conflicts arise. In time of conflict, data-driven employees who rely on hard facts will have an easier time diffusing political conflicts. Always looking out for the best interests of your company is a certain way to ensure that your motivation will remain unquestioned.  L.A. Witt, from the University of New Orleans, through his findings, believes that if supervisors were to mold employee values to match their own, it would protect employees from the negative effects of organizational politics and help improve their performance.

See also

References

 Krackhardt, David "Assessing the political landscape: structure, cognition, and power in organizations", Administrative Science Quarterly, June 1990.
 Dwyer, Kelly Pate "How to Win at Office Politics", bnet.com, July 2, 2007
 Witt, L.A. (1998) Enhancing Organizational Goal Congruence: A Solution to Organizational Politics. Journal of Applied Psychology, 83(4), 666-674. www.businesspsych.org

Further reading
Bancroft-Turner D & Hailstone P Workplace Politics (2008), Management Pocketbooks, 
 

Interpersonal conflict
Office work
Organizational behavior
Politics by issue
Workplace
Workplace bullying